A dialer (American English) or dialler (British English) is an electronic device that is connected to a telephone line to monitor the dialed numbers and alter them to seamlessly provide services that otherwise require lengthy National or International access codes to be dialed. A dialer automatically inserts and modifies the numbers depending on the time of day, country or area code dialed, allowing the user to subscribe to the service providers who offer the best rates.  For example, a dialer could be programmed to use one service provider for international calls and another for cellular calls.  This process is known as prefix insertion or least cost routing.  A line powered dialer does not need any external power but instead takes the power it needs from the telephone line.

Another type of dialer is a computer program which creates a connection to the Internet or another computer network over the analog telephone or Integrated Services Digital Network (ISDN). Many operating systems already contain such a program for connections through the Point-to-Point Protocol (PPP), such as WvDial.

Many internet service providers offer installation CDs to simplify the process of setting up a proper Internet connection. They either create an entry in the OS's dialer or install a separate dialer (as the AOL software does).

In recent years, the term "dialer" often refers specifically to dialers that connect without the user's full knowledge as to cost, with the creator of the dialer intending to commit fraud.

Dialing modes
In Call Centers there are several dialing modes depending on how the call is placed. 'Manual Dialing' refers to calls that are placed manually by an agent.

There are 4 different dialing modes depending on how software dialers selects the contacts that are going to be called and starts making the calls. Automated dialers such as those sold by Noble Systems, Avaya, Ricochet360 (formerly known as Speed To Contact), and Convoso (formerly SafeSoft Solutions) can place calls using *preview*, *power*, auto dialing, or predictive dialing. The dialing modes are defined according to the campaign and type of business.

Preview
Preview dialing enables agents to first view the available information about the customer and decide when to place the call. In addition to the information about the customer, agents may also view all the history of the customer with the contact center. After viewing the information about the customer, the agent requests the system to make the call.

For example, preview dialing is useful in debt collection campaigns to allow agents to view information about the customer and define a strategy before starting to talk to the customer.
The system delivers preview calls to agents automatically, taking into account the priority of the call and the skills of the agent to handle the call. Preview dialing keeps agents from dialing calls manually.

Predictive
Predictive dialing is a state-of-the-art pacing mode used to call a large number of customers within a short period of time.  Predictive dialing optimizes the time of agents by reducing the idle times between connected calls and freeing agents from dialing calls. Predictive dialing gathers statistics concerning the duration of calls, how long it takes for calls to be answered, and how often are calls answered. When an agent is about to become idle, the system places several calls.

Predictive dialing campaigns can achieve agent productivity of 50 minutes per hour and nuisance ratios of 3% or less. The system is continually updating predictive dialing probabilities and monitoring nuisance ratios for performance and compliance with legislation.
For example, predictive dialing is useful in sales campaigns to call a large number of contacts and maximizing the working time of agents.

The performance of predictive dialing takes into consideration the accuracy of the contact lists and the policies on nuisance calls. If the contact list is poor, the performance of the predictive dialing campaign is at risk as agents are not connected to live contacts and are not able to do business.

Power IVR
Power IVR is used to deliver a pre-recorded message to a large call list. When a call is answered, Power IVR will play the audio file, and then collect touch tone key responses or speech command at the end of the message, and then transfer the call to an agent or remove the caller from the call list. In other words, IVR is a technology that allows a computer to interact with humans through the use of voice and DTMF tones input via keypad.

Voice Drop
Voice drop is same as Power IVR, except it will not wait for the touch tone key responses or speech command at the end of the message, after playing the message, call is dropped, mostly this is used for payment reminders and similar.

Fraudulent dialer 
Dialers are necessary to connect to the internet (at least for non-broadband connections), but some dialers are designed to connect to premium-rate numbers. The providers of such dialers often search for security holes in the operating system installed on the user's computer and use them to set the computer up to dial up through their number, so as to make money from the calls. Alternatively, some dialers inform the user what it is that they are doing, with the promise of special content, accessible only via the special number. Examples of this content include software for download, (usually illegal) trojans posing as MP3s, trojans posing as pornography, or 'underground' programs such as cracks and keygens.

The cost of setting up such a service is relatively low, amounting to a few thousand dollars for telecommunications equipment, whereupon the unscrupulous operator will typically take 90% of the cost of a premium rate call, with very few overheads of their own.

Users with DSLs (or similar broadband connections) are usually not affected. A dialer can be downloaded and installed, but dialing in is not possible as there are no regular phone numbers in the DSL network and users will not typically have their dial-up modem, if any, connected to a phone line. However, if an ISDN adapter or additional analog modem is installed, the dialer might still be able to get a connection.

Malicious dialers can be identified by the following characteristics: 
A download popup opens when opening a website.
On the website there is only a small hint, if any, about the price.
The download starts even if the cancel button has been clicked.
The dialer installs as default connection without any notice.
The dialer creates unwanted connections by itself and without user interaction.
The dialer does not show any notice about the price (only few do) before dialing in.
The high price of the connection is not being shown while connected
The dialer cannot be uninstalled, or only with serious effort.

Installation routes 

Computers running Microsoft Windows without anti-virus software or proper updates could be vulnerable to Visual Basic-scripts which install a trojan horse which changes values in the Windows Registry and sets Internet Explorer security settings in a way that ActiveX controls can be downloaded from the Internet without warning. After this change is made, when a user accesses a malicious page or email message, it can start installing the dialer. The script also disables the modem speaker and messages that normally come up while dialing into a network. Users of Microsoft Office Outlook, Outlook Express and Internet Explorer are especially affected if running ActiveX controls and JavaScript is allowed and the latest security patches from Microsoft have not been installed.
In March 2004, there were malicious dialers that could be installed through fake anti-virus software. E-mail spam from a so-called "AntiVirus Team" for example, contained download links to programs named "downloadtool.exe" or "antivirus.exe", which are malicious dialers. Other ways of transmission include electronic greeting cards that link to pages that tricks the user to install ActiveX controls, which in turn install dialers in the background.

Therefore, links in spam emails should never be opened, automatically started downloads should be canceled as soon as discovered, and one should check on each dial-up to the Internet to see whether the displayed phone number is unchanged. Another way to protect oneself is to disable premium numbers through one's phone services, but of course this disables all such services.

One should never run foreign code in a privileged environment unless the source is trustworthy. It is also advisable to protect oneself with anti-malware programs.

German regulatory law 

On 15 August 2003, a new law came into effect in Germany called "Gesetz zur Bekämpfung des Missbrauchs von (0)190er/(0)900er Mehrwertdiensterufnummern" ("Law for the combat of misuse of (0)190/(0)900 value added service numbers").

The law contains the following regulations:
Forced price notices for service providers.
Maximum price limits, legitimacy checks and automatic disconnects.
Registration of dialers.
Blocking of dialers.
Right of information for consumers from the RegTP.

On 4 March 2004 the German Federal Supreme Court in Karlsruhe decided that fees for the usage of dialers do not have to be paid if it was used without the user's knowledge.

United Kingdom regulatory law 
In December 2016, Ofcom (The Office of Communications) announced changes to their call centre regulations. These focused on the persistent use of dialers to make call to residential telephone numbers. They also added extra clarity to how call centres should approach the issue of silent and abandoned calls.

Ofcom, now also regulate how abandoned call messages should work. A message should now state the company name, reason for calling but importantly not be used as an opportunity to market the business.

See also

 Predictive dialer System for dialing many numbers, typically used by call centers
 War dialing Automatically scanning a list of telephone numbers to detect computers, usually for nefarious purposes
 Dialer management platform
 XXXDial  historical example of dialer/spyware

References

Telephony
Types of malware